NF-kappa-B inhibitor-like protein 1 is a protein that in humans is encoded by the NFKBIL1 gene.

Function 

This gene encodes a divergent member of the I-kappa-B family of proteins. Its function is unclear. The gene lies within the major histocompatibility complex (MHC) class I region on chromosome 6.

Model organisms 

Model organisms have been used in the study of NFKBIL1 function. A conditional knockout mouse line called Nfkbil1tm1a(KOMP)Wtsi was generated at the Wellcome Trust Sanger Institute. Male and female animals underwent a standardized phenotypic screen to determine the effects of deletion. Additional screens performed:  - In-depth immunological phenotyping

References

Further reading